Doris E. Abramson (died January 7, 2008) was a professor, author, editor, and bookstore proprietor in the United States. She did her dissertation at Columbia University and published a book on black playwrights. The University of Massachusetts at Amherst has a collection of her papers.

Life
She grew up in Amherst and taught at the University of Massachusetts at Amherst. The school's has a photo of her from ca. 1948.

She died of cancer at her home in New Salem.

Books
Negro Playwrights in the American Theatre, 1925-1959

References

Year of birth missing
2008 deaths